You're Mine, Only Mine is the 7th installment of the Precious Hearts Romances Presents series. Starring Denise Laurel and Will Devaughn.

Plot
The story began when Roxanne (Denise Laurel) found out that her late father used her to pay for his own debt with his boss, Alex (Will Devaughn). Alex forced Roxanne to be his wife. What seemed at first to be an obligation will ultimately lead to true love.

Cast and characters

Main cast
 Denise Laurel as Roxanne Bernardo – A bright young woman with big dreams. She hopes that her late father's Pineapple farm would soon progress and grow. She wants to help her Auntie the way she helped her and she also provides for the schooling of her sibling. When she realized that her father used her as a payment for his debt she was willing to do her obligations as a wife to Alex.
 Will Devaughn as Alex Moravilla – A hardened businessman. It's already his reputation to be ruthless when it comes to doing business. Roxanne already expected this from him but what she will learn about him will eventually be the cause for her to fall in love with Alex.

Supporting cast
Jairus Aquino as Raymond
Victor Basa as Antonio
Regine Angeles as Dahlia
Alwyn Uytingco as Robert
Rey "PJ" Abellana as Alejandro
Johnny Revilla as Perry
Tanya Gomez as Pilar
Susan Africa as Theresa

See also
Precious Hearts Romances Presents

References

ABS-CBN drama series
Philippine romance television series
Television shows based on books
2010 Philippine television series debuts
2010 Philippine television series endings
Filipino-language television shows
Television shows set in the Philippines